The Namibia men's national field hockey team represents Namibia in men's international field hockey competitions and is controlled by the Namibia Hockey Union, the governing body for field hockey in Namibia.

Tournament record

Africa Cup of Nations
 1996 – 5th
 2000 – 6th
 2005 – 5th
 2022 – 7th

African Games
1995 – 5th
 2023 - Qualified

African Olympic Qualifier
2015 – 7th
2019 – 6th

FIH Hockey Series
2018–19 – First round

Hockey World League
2016–17 – Round 1

See also
Namibia women's national field hockey team

References

African men's national field hockey teams
National team
Field hockey